Complex Systems is a quarterly peer-reviewed open access scientific journal covering subjects ranging across a number of scientific and engineering fields, including computational biology, computer science, mathematics, and physics. It was established in 1987 with Stephen Wolfram as founding editor-in-chief. The journal is published by Complex Systems Publications.

Abstracting and indexing
The journal is abstracted and indexed in:

See also
List of journals in systems science

References

External links

Publications established in 1987
Systems journals
Computer science journals
Quarterly journals
English-language journals

Open access journals